Zha Fuxi (1895–1976), also known as Zha Yiping was a leading player and scholar of the guqin. Born in Jiangxi, he started learning guqin in his childhood. In 1936, he co-founded the Jinyu Qin Society which later became one of the major national musical organizations for the guqin.

Apart from his profession on guqin, he worked for the civil aviation company and was active in the labour movement. After the People's Republic of China was established in 1949, he was a vice-chairman of the National Musical Association, president of the Beijing Guqin Society, and a department head at the Central Institute of (Folk) Music.

Few recordings of his qin performance have been published, though more remain in private and institutional circulation. His playing style was unaffected but serious and elegant; he specialized in qin songs (accompanying himself vocally) and contributed several noteworthy dapu reconstructions, as well as earning the nickname "Zha Xiaoxiang" for his mastery of the piece Xiao Xiang Shui Yun.

See also 
Please see: References section in the guqin article for a full list of references used in all qin related articles.

References

External links
 Zha Fuxi's report of classical guqin pieces recorded across China in 1956.
  Recordings of Zha Fuxi from the Library of Congress made in 1945.

1895 births
1976 deaths
Guqin players
People's Republic of China musicians
Musicians from Jiangxi